Rita Irene Koys (July 1, 1929 – May 11, 2009), better known as Shanthi Lekha, was a Sri Lankan Film actress. She played the role of mother in more films than any other actress in Sinhala cinema.

Personal life
Lekha was born in Kalutara on July 1, 1929. She received her stage name from her first husband Shanthi Viraj. They had first met while she was attending Holy Family Convent in Kalutara.

She died in France May 11, 2009.

Career
She starred in composer D. T. Fernando's play Shantha Prabha (1942). She subsequently made a mark as a dancer in plays starring Dommie Jayawardena and Nona Subeda.

With Jayawardena, Lekha had her first film role in Sujatha (1953). Wearing a bathing suit, she danced along with Jayawardena to the song "Pem Rella Nagi." The role came with a payment of Rs. 500 and a contract prohibiting her from doing films for other production companies. The producer K. Gunaratnam would subsequently offer her roles in Warada Kageda, Radala Piliruwa and Dosthara.

Lekha first played a mother in Sandesaya (1960). She would play this role in over 350 films.

Lekha won Best Supporting Actress Awards at the Sarasaviya Film Festival for Gamini Fonseka's Parasathu Mal (1968) and Mudalinayaka Somaratne's Binaramali (1969). She also won Presidential Awards for Mayurige Kathawa and Ridi Nimnaya.

Filmography

References

External links

Sri Lankan film actresses
1929 births
2009 deaths
20th-century Sri Lankan actresses